End of Fashion is the debut album by Australian band End of Fashion. It was released in Australia on 15 August 2005, reaching number 3 in the Australian ARIA Albums Chart, and was certified gold by the Australian Recording Industry Association in 2006. It features the single "O Yeah", which reached number 21 on the Australian ARIA Singles Chart.

It also features re-recorded versions of previously released songs, "Rough Diamonds" and "She's Love" from the Rough Diamonds EP, and "Too Careful" and "Love Comes In" from the Too Careful EP.

Additional musicians on the album include Hugh Jennings (a former bassist for End of Fashion), Katy Steele of Little Birdy, and producer Dennis Herring.

Criticism 
End of Fashion have been criticised for their uncredited copying of the guitar riff from the Pixies song "Where Is My Mind?" for their song "O Yeah". Rockus Online Magazine reviewer Jonathon Miller called the song "disturbingly Pixies-ish" and went on to write:
"End of Fashion are having no problem appealing to the 95% of people that haven't heard (and still remember) the Pixies' "Where Is My Mind?" and have never experienced a truly exciting live show, and if that's what the band is aiming for, then they are a complete success."

Track listing

Personnel 
All credits adapted from liner notes.
 Recorded and mixed at Sweet Tea Recording Studio, Oxford, M.S., U.S.
 Mastered at Masterdisk
 Published by EMI Music Publishing, except track 11, EMI Music Publishing / Control

End of Fashion
 Justin Burford
 Rodney Aravena
 Nicholas Jonsson
 Tom King

Additional musicians
 Hugh Jennings
 Dennis Herring
 Katy Steele
 Riley Woolworth
 Raina Woolworth
 Cara Stewart
 Alex Henson
 Lauren Butler
 Margaret "Meggie" Brown
 Katherine Salter
 Amanda Miller
 Meagan Mckibben
 Megan Sellers
 Amy Stanfill

Production and technical
 Dennis Herring – producer, mixing
 Jacquire King – recording, mixing
 Clay Jones – recording
 Patrick Addison – 2nd engineer
 Colby Devereaux – 2nd engineer
 Dawn Palladino – 2nd engineer

Artwork
 Debaser – artwork
 Blasius Erlinger – photography
 Tony Mott – band photography
 John Stanton – band photography

Charts

References

External links 
 

2005 debut albums
End of Fashion albums
Capitol Records albums
Albums produced by Dennis Herring